Shawsheen Cemetery is a historic cemetery on Great Road and Shawsheen Road in Bedford, Massachusetts. The cemetery is Bedford's second, opened in 1849 as its Old Burying Ground was filling up. The original ten acres, and a number of smaller additions between 1894 and 1959, were laid out in the rural cemetery style made fashionable in the 19th century.

The older sections of the cemetery were listed on the National Register of Historic Places in 2007.

American actress Alexandra Carlisle (1886–1936) is buried at Shawsheen.

See also
 National Register of Historic Places listings in Middlesex County, Massachusetts

References

External links

 

Cemeteries on the National Register of Historic Places in Massachusetts
Cemeteries in Middlesex County, Massachusetts
Buildings and structures in Bedford, Massachusetts
National Register of Historic Places in Middlesex County, Massachusetts
Rural cemeteries
1849 establishments in Massachusetts